Several special routes of U.S. Route 68 exist from Kentucky to Ohio. In order from west to east in Kentucky, and south to north in Ohio, these special routes are listed from the beginning of U.S. Route 68 (US 68) to the end.

Cadiz business loop

U.S. Route 68 Business is a business route in Cadiz, Kentucky. It runs through Cadiz, and intersects with Kentucky Route 1170 (KY 1170), KY 274, and KY 139.

Hopkinsville bypass

U.S. Route 68 Bypass is a business route in Hopkinsville, Kentucky. It bypasses Hopkinsville to the south and intersects with the Pennyrile Parkway and US 41 Alt., and US 41, along with Kentucky Route 272 (KY 272), KY 695, KY 107, and KY 109.

This by-pass route also serves as the truck route, therefore it is also signed as U.S. Route 68 Truck.

Fairview alternate loop

U.S. Route 68 Alternate (US 68 Alt.) is a  alternate route in Fairview, Kentucky. It travels through the community south of the main four-lane US 68 corridor. This highway is in east-central Christian and west-central Todd counties.

Elkton business loop

U.S. Route 68 Business is a business route in Elkton, Kentucky. It runs through Elkton south of the main US 68 corridor. It intersects with Kentucky Route 181 (KY 181) and KY 102.

Russellville business loop

U.S. Route 68 Business is a business route in Russellville, Kentucky. It runs through downtown Russellville while US 68 bypasses the town to the north. It intersects with  Kentucky Route 3233 (KY 3233), KY 178, KY 2146, KY 3519, and KY 3240.

Auburn business loop

U.S. Route 68 Business is a business route in Auburn, Kentucky. It runs through Auburn south of the main US 68 corridor. It intersects with Kentucky Route 103 (KY 103).

Bowling Green business loop

U.S. Route 68 Business is a business route in Bowling Green, Kentucky. It runs through Bowling Green south of the main US 68 corridor, which uses a bypass around Bowling Green. It intersects with US 231 Bus.

Glasgow business loop

U.S. Route 68 Business is a business route in Glasgow, Kentucky. It runs through Glasgow south of the main US 68 corridor, which uses a bypass around Glasgow. It runs concurrent with Kentucky Route 80 for its entire length. It intersects with U.S. Route 31E, U.S. Route 31E Business, and Kentucky Route 90 (KY 90), and KY 1307.

Glasgow truck route

U.S. Route 68 Truck (US 68 Truck) is a truck route in Glasgow, Kentucky.

The component highways for the truck route includes the following:
US 68 Business from the US 68/KY 80/KY 3600 junction to the US 31E junction
U.S. Route 31E from US 68 Business to the Louie B. Nunn Cumberland Parkway
Cumberland Parkway between exits 11 and 14, and
KY 90 from the Cumberland Parkway exit 14 to the US 68 Business (Columbia Avenue) intersection.

In addition Kentucky Route 90 Truck accompanies US 68 Truck through its concurrencies with US 31E and the Cumberland Parkway.

Paris business loop

U.S. Route 68 Business is a business route in Paris, Kentucky. It runs through Paris south of the main US 68 corridor, which uses a bypass around Paris. It intersects with US 460 and Kentucky Route 1678 (KY 1678) and KY 627.

Maysville business spur

U.S. Route 68 Business is a short business route in Washington, Maysville, Kentucky.

It formerly ran through downtown Maysville and to Aberdeen, Ohio. It ran through Maysville southeast of the main US 68 corridor, which bypasses Maysville to the north. US 68 Bus. ran concurrent with US 62 for most of its length. It intersected with Kentucky Route 2515 (KY 2515), KY 1236, KY 9 (AA Hwy.), KY 1448, KY 2516, KY 10, and KY 8. US 68 Bus. then crossed the Ohio River via the Simon Kenton Memorial Bridge and ran concurrently with US 52 for most of its length in Ohio. It ran through Aberdeen and intersected with State Route 41. Today, US 68 Bus. only runs from US 68 to the former beginning of its overlap with US 62 in Washington.

References

68
 
68
68